The artillery of World War I, which led to trench warfare, was an important factor in the war, influenced its tactics, operations, and incorporated strategies that were used by the belligerents to break the stalemate at the front. World War I raised artillery to a new level of importance on the battlefield.

The First World War saw many developments in artillery warfare.  Artillery could now fire the new high explosive shells, and throw them farther and at a higher rate of fire.  Because of this, enemies in trenches were no longer always safe, and could constantly be fired upon.  In some areas, artillery concentration was common, with several guns firing onto an area such as a line of trenches, each gun firing several rounds per minute for hours.  Artillery barrages were also used before an infantry battle, to distract the enemy away from the place of attack, or the paths behind the lines were fired on so that enemy reinforcements could not safely reach the front lines.

Mortars were revived by the Germans because of their ability to shoot at an angle above 45 degrees, and they, therefore, could theoretically (although not often) drop shells directly in an enemy's trench before exploding, for maximum damage. Artillery shells were used for chemical weapon emission by the German troops in 1915, and the Allies followed their example after the Second Battle of Ypres.

Strategy 
Artillery is generally a split into two categories: light artillery and heavy artillery. Light artillery, commonly known as field artillery, is designed to be lightweight and easy to transport by ordinary infantry. The need to be lightweight limited the size of the shells and the damage they could inflict on the enemy. Heavy artillery is difficult to transport and typically used in fixed positions during siege warfare. Heavy artillery typically requires specialized troops and transport infrastructure.

The belligerents were not prepared for the nature of World War I. Military doctrine before the war, particularly for the Germans, focused on aggressive attacks on the enemy, based on Germany's experience in the Franco-Prussian War in 1870. This doctrine failed to account to the numerous new technologies that defined World War 1, including machine guns, armored vehicles, and artillery that had greatly improved. These changes made the war primarily a defensive war, and also resulted in artillery being the greatest cause of casualties during the war, unlike previous wars. Early in the war, the Germans attempted several attacks without adequate artillery support, with disastrous results.

Before the war, light artillery was becoming more common among the world's militaries. However, the development of trench warfare and the resulting stalemates increased the importance of heavy artillery. While the light artillery remained in use, it was supplemented by heavy artillery installed in fixed positions. Because of the need for heavy artillery, many older guns from the 1800s were used. While these guns lacked the capabilities of newer artillery, they could still fire large shells over long distances.

Several new methods and tactics for artillery were developed during the war, including:
 Box barrage
 Chinese barrage
 Clock method of calling fall of shot
 Creeping barrage
 Artillery sound ranging

While artillery was able to inflict major damage to the enemy, it faced several disadvantages. Throughout the war, forces struggled to locate their targets, and when they did locate them, it was difficult to hit them. Communications between infantry and artillery was also a major problem that was never solved during the course of the war. This meant that the artillery wasn't able to adapt their firing to meet the needs of infantry. Finally, artillery was expensive, demanding lots of time and materials of the belligerents.

Technology 
Despite the advent of new technologies like aircraft, machine guns, and armored vehicles, artillery was the primary weapon of World War I. Artillery was the primary threat to ground troops in the war and was the main reason for the development of trench warfare.

A key advancement in artillery was developed by the French in 1897, with the invention of the long barrel recoil. Before this invention, each time the artillery was fired, the entire gun would be pushed backwards by the force of the shell firing. This meant that the artillery had to be re-set into position each time it was fired. The long barrel recoil technology placed the gun within a barrel that included a system to absorb the momentum from firing the gun, allowing the artillery to remain stationary as it was fired.

The Germans innovated what was known as heavy artillery in the field army. While heavy artillery is normally not mobile and only suitable for sieges, the Germans were able to develop mobile weapons that were more powerful than traditional light artillery.

The Germans also improved mortar technologies. While artillery fires in a horizontal direction, mortars in a more vertical direction. Mortars had largely fallen out of use in the 1800s, however, the Germans saw the potential while observing the Russo-Japanese War in 1905. By the time the war arrived in 1914, the Germans had a stockpile of mortars ready for use. The French and British were caught completely off-guard by the return of mortars. However, once they saw mortars used by the Germans, they both quickly adopted the new technologies and brought them to the battlefield. Mortars were particularly effective during the war since their vertical trajectory potentially allowed them to fall straight into enemy trenches.

World War 1 also saw the development of the first anti-aircraft artillery, as well as light mortars that could be carried by infantry troops.

National forces

Austria-Hungary 
 Despite having developed new types of world class modern cannons, the majority of the Austro-Hungarian artillery pieces were from old and very obsolete types. Only Germany and Austria-Hungary developed heavy field artillery before the WW1. The armed forces of the Austro-Hungarian Empire were in decline at the start of the war due to the insufficient finance of the armament. Among the European powers, in proportion to its national income, Austria-Hungary paid the lowest attention to the development of its army. While they had powerful artillery, their technology was often behind their rivals due to the absolute dominance of old types of cannons. They did well at building efficient and mobile artillery, particularly their mountain guns which worked well in mountainous terrain. However, due to a mix of cost-savings and tradition, they failed to adopt technological improvements, such as steel barrels. The Empire ceased to exist at the end of the war and most of its artillery was seized by the Italians.

France 
The long barrel recoil technology developed by the French revolutionized artillery and made previous artillery obsolete. However, early in the war, the French over-relied on this gun under the assumption that it was the only artillery they needed. The development of trench warfare demonstrated the need for a wider variety of artillery, which mostly entered service in 1916 and 1917. Much of this artillery was kept in service and used to battle the Nazis in the Battle of France in 1940. France did not develop heavy field artillery in pre WW1 era. Similar to the British army, France suffered higher ratio of KIA in the trench warfare due to the lack of heavy artillery during the first years of the war.

Germany 
Germany had the best artillery of all participating countries when the war began in 1914. The Germans had carefully researched previous conflicts and developed state-of-the-art technology that out-performed their rivals. Like all countries, Germany struggled to replace artillery lost in combat, and they were forced to improvise with available materials as the war progressed. After the war, Germany was forced to destroy most of their artillery as part of the Treaty of Versailles.

Great Britain 

Great Britain's preparations were largely guided by their experience in the Boer War from 1899-1902. The British purchased the field guns that the Boers had used against them, and used these as prototypes for their own weapons. The British also modeled their Howitzers after those used by the Boers. Some British designs were used by the United States. The British also supplied guns to Australia and New Zealand. Despite the long tradition of British naval heavy artillery developments, the Empire did not have heavy field artillery before the WW1, which caused disadvantage for the British infantry in the first years of the war.

Italy 
Italy did not join the war until 1915, and did not have any industry designing artillery. It therefore used artillery designs from other countries, built in Italian factories. The Italians lost nearly all their artillery in the Battle of Caporetto, requiring a massive effort to rebuild, and also requiring supplies from allied nations. The Italians also used artillery that they captured from Austria-Hungary. After the war, the Italians seized most of the Austria-Hungarian weaponry, and some was still in service during World War 2.

United States 
The United States lacked industry that could build artillery and was only able to do so in collaboration with European manufacturers. With the outbreak of the war in 1914, this collaboration came to an end as European manufacturers focused on equipping their home countries. When the United States entered the war in 1917, it was clear that their artillery would not be sufficient, so the USA mostly used French and British artillery.

List of artillery units

Allied powers

 Canon de 155 C modele 1917 Schneider
 Canon de 155mm GPF
 Canon de 75 modèle 1897
 Canon de 155 L modèle 1877/14 Schneider
 De Bange 90 mm cannon
 Lahitolle 95 mm cannon
 BL 14-inch railway howitzer
 BL 9.1-inch howitzer
 BL 14-inch howitzer
 BL 50-pounder gun
 Ordnance QF 18-pounder
 QF 5.2-inch Gun Mk I–IV
 4-inch M1902 field gun

Central Powers
 10 cm M. 14 Feldhaubitze
 10.5 cm leFH 16
 15 cm Kanone 16
 15 cm sFH 13
 Paris Gun
 21 cm Mörser 16
 Big Bertha (howitzer)
 42 cm Gamma Mörser
 38 cm Belagerungshaubitze M 16
 Skoda 305 mm Model 1911
 42 cm Haubitze M. 14/16
 35 cm Marinekanone L/45 M. 16
 7.7 cm FK 96
 7.7 cm FK 16
 9 cm Feldkanone M 75/96

See also 

Field artillery
Infantry support guns
Mortars
Weapons of World War I

References

 Gudmundsson, Bruce I., On Artillery, Praeger, London, 1993
 Rawling, Bill; Surviving Trench Warfare - Technology and the Canadian Corps, 1914-1918, University of Toronto Press, Toronto, 1992

Further reading

 Right of the Line: History Of The American Field Artillery, US Army Field Artillery School, Ft. Sill Oklahoma, April 1984 
Terraine, John; The Smoke and the Fire: Myths and Anti-myths of War, 1861-1945, Pen and Sword, 2004
Terraine, John; White Heat: The New Warfare 1914-18, Pen & Sword Books, 1992

World War I artillery